Queen of Hearts  is a 1936 British musical comedy film directed by Monty Banks and starring Gracie Fields, John Loder and Enid Stamp-Taylor.

Plot summary
Grace Perkins (Gracie Fields) is an ordinary working class seamstress who is mistaken as a rich patron of the arts. When she's asked to back a new show she plays along with the charade, hoping that she can become the production's leading lady. When the show opens Grace is a huge hit and goes on to become a glamorous star.

Cast
 Gracie Fields as Grace Perkins
 John Loder as Derek Cooper
 Enid Stamp-Taylor as Yvonne
 Fred Duprez as Zulenberg
 Edward Rigby as Perkins
 Julie Suedo as Rita Dow
 Jean Lester as Mrs. Perkins
 Hal Gordon as Stage Manager
 Syd Crossley as Constable
 Madeline Seymour as Mrs. Vandeleur
 H. F. Maltby as Solicitor
 Margaret Yarde as Mrs. Porter

References

Bibliography
 Low, Rachael. Filmmaking in 1930s Britain. George Allen & Unwin, 1985.
 Perry, George. Forever Ealing. Pavilion Books, 1994.
 Wood, Linda. British Films, 1927-1939. British Film Institute, 1986.

External links

1930s English-language films
1936 films
Films set in London
1936 musical comedy films
British musical comedy films
Associated Talking Pictures
Films directed by Monty Banks
British black-and-white films
1930s British films